Cyrus Leopold "Leo" Sulzberger (aka Cyrus Lindauer Sulzberger; July 11, 1858 – April 30, 1932) was an American merchant and philanthropist. He was president of the Jewish Agricultural and Industrial Aid Society.

Early life 
Sulzberger was born in Philadelphia, Pennsylvania, to Leopold Sulzberger (1805-1881) and Sophia Lindauer (1830-1909). Leopold had a brother Abraham Sulzberger (1810-1880) and they both migrated from Heidelsheim, Germany to Philadelphia.

Sulzberger was educated at the Hebrew Education Society, and the Philadelphia Central High School.

Personal life 
Sulzberger married Rachel Peixotto Hays and had a son, Arthur Hays Sulzberger. He died on April 30, 1932 in Manhattan, New York City.

References

1858 births
1932 deaths
American people of German-Jewish descent
Sulzberger family